Nicorette (also known as Skandia) is a  Ericsson 80 yacht.

Career
Nicorette won Round Gotland Race and broke the record as the fastest monohull yacht over the Atlantic. She broke the 92-year-old record of Atlantic in 1997.

Nicorette was later renamed Skandia and competed in the Adecco World Championships.

See also
Nicorette (1989 yacht)

References

1990s sailing yachts
Sailing yachts built in France
Sailing yachts of Sweden
Sailing yachts designed by Bruce Farr
Farr Maxi One Design yachts